Teoscar José Hernández (born October 15, 1992) is a Dominican professional baseball outfielder for the Seattle Mariners of Major League Baseball (MLB). He has previously played in MLB for the Houston Astros and Toronto Blue Jays. Hernández was an All-Star in 2021 and has won two Silver Slugger Awards.

Professional career

Houston Astros

Hernández signed with the Houston Astros as an international free agent in February 2011. He made his professional debut that season for the Dominican Summer League Astros. Hernández played 2012 with the Rookie-level Gulf Coast Astros and the Class-A Lexington Legends of the South Atlantic League. He appeared in 59 total games, and recorded a .243 batting average, five home runs, 23 runs batted in (RBI), and 11 stolen bases. He played the entire 2013 season with the Class-A Quad City River Bandits, and hit .271 with 13 home runs, 55 RBI, and 24 stolen bases. During the offseason, Hernández appeared in 23 games for the Toros del Este of the Dominican Winter League.

Hernández started 2014 with the Lancaster JetHawks of the Advanced-A California League, and was promoted to the Corpus Christi Hooks of the Double-A Texas League during the season. In 119 games, Hernández hit .292 with 21 home runs, 85 RBI, and 33 stolen bases. 

He played the entire 2015 season with Double-A Corpus Christi, batting .219 with 17 home runs, 48 RBI, and 33 steals in 119 games. After the season, he was selected to the roster for the Dominican Republic national baseball team at the 2015 WBSC Premier12.

Hernández began the 2016 season with Corpus Christi, and was promoted to the Fresno Grizzlies of the Triple-A Pacific Coast League in late June. On August 12, 2016, the Astros promoted Hernández to the major leagues. He remained with the Astros through the end of the 2016 season, and hit .230 with four home runs and 11 RBI in 41 games. In the minors that year, Hernández batted .307 in 107 games, with 10 home runs, 53 RBI, and 34 stolen bases.

On March 21, 2017, Hernández was optioned to Triple-A Fresno. On April 25, 2017, the Astros promoted Hernández to the major leagues to replace an injured Jake Marisnick. However, he was placed on the 10-day disabled list the next day.

Toronto Blue Jays
On July 31, 2017, the Astros traded Hernández and Nori Aoki to the Toronto Blue Jays for Francisco Liriano. Hernández was assigned to the Triple-A Buffalo Bisons. On August 31, Blue Jays' manager John Gibbons announced that Hernández would be called up on September 1. On September 10, 2017 Hernández hit his first home run as a Blue Jay against the Detroit Tigers. The game also marked the first multi home run game of his career. In 26 games played, Hernández hit .261 with eight home runs and 20 RBIs.

Hernández started the 2018 season with Buffalo, and was recalled on April 13, 2018 when Josh Donaldson was placed on the disabled list. When Hernández returned to Houston with the Blue Jays on June 25, he was presented with a 2017 World Series ring alongside Blue Jays teammate Tyler Clippard. Though he struggled defensively in left field during his first full major league season, Hernández emerged as one of Toronto's top offensive players, slugging 51 extra-base hits in his first 100 games. In 134 games for the Blue Jays, he hit .239 with 22 home runs. He struggled through the first 2 months of the season in 2019, hitting .189 with 3 home runs. He was optioned to AAA on May 16 for 2 weeks and returned to the Major league team to play center field much improved. He would finish the season with 26 home runs in 125 games.

Overall with the 2020 Blue Jays, Hernández batted .289 with 16 home runs and 34 RBIs in 50 games. Hernandez won the AL Silver Slugger Award for right field in the shortened season, recording the fourth-best at-bats per home run average in the American League.

In 2021, Hernández earned his first career All-Star nod as he was selected to start the 2021 All-Star Game for the American League. Hernandez finished the 2021 season batting .296, a career high 32 home runs, and 116 RBIs. He also won the AL Silver Slugger for right field for the second year in a row.

On March 22, 2022, Hernández signed a $10.65 million contract with the Blue Jays, avoiding salary arbitration.

Seattle Mariners
On November 16, 2022, the Blue Jays traded Hernández to the Seattle Mariners for Erik Swanson and Adam Macko.

Personal life
Hernández is married and has three children.

References

External links

1992 births
Living people
American League All-Stars
Buffalo Bisons (minor league) players
Corpus Christi Hooks players
Dominican Republic expatriate baseball players in Canada
Dominican Republic expatriate baseball players in the United States
Dominican Republic national baseball team players
Dominican Summer League Astros players
Fresno Grizzlies players
Gulf Coast Astros players
Houston Astros players
Lancaster JetHawks players

Lexington Legends players
Major League Baseball outfielders
Major League Baseball players from the Dominican Republic
People from Cotuí
Quad Cities River Bandits players
Silver Slugger Award winners
Toronto Blue Jays players
Toros del Este players
2015 WBSC Premier12 players
2023 World Baseball Classic players